Almánzar is a Spanish surname. Notable people with the surname include:
Belcalis Almanzar, American rapper better known as Cardi B
Bethania Almánzar, beach volleyball player from the Dominican Republic
Carlos Almanzar, baseball player and son of Michael Almanzar
Hennessy Carolina Almánzar, American social media personality and sister of Cardi B
Michael Almanzar, baseball player and father of Carols Almanzar

Spanish-language surnames